Cole Eiserman (born August 29, 2006) is an American collegiate ice hockey left wing for USNTDP Juniors of the United States Hockey League (USHL). Along with Macklin Celebrini, he is seen as the most likely North American player to be picked first overall in the 2024 NHL Entry Draft.

Playing career
Playing for the Shattuck-Saint Mary's in the 2020–21 season, Eiserman scored 97 goals with 57 assists for 154 points in 50 games. Only two players, Sidney Crosby and Jonathan Toews, recorded more goals for Shattuck's U18 team as a 15-year-old.

Eiserman has played for Team USA's U-17 and U-18 programs. He scored 13 points in five games, ranking second in scoring at the World Under-17 Hockey Challenge.

Eiserman is committed to playing for the University of Minnesota.

Personal
Eiserman's father, Bill Eiserman, played for UMass Lowell from 1986 to 1987. Eiserman's uncle, Ed Hill, was drafted by the Nashville Predators in 1999. Eiserman has four brothers, including a twin, all of whom play hockey at various levels. One his brothers, Shane Eiserman, was drafted by the Ottawa Senators in the fourth round of the 2014 NHL Entry Draft.

References

External links
 

2006 births
Living people
USA Hockey National Team Development Program players
American ice hockey left wingers
Ice hockey people from Massachusetts
People from Newburyport, Massachusetts